A girandole (from French, in turn from Italian girandola) is an ornamental branched candlestick or light fixture consisting of several lights, often resembling a small chandelier. Girandoles came into use about the second half of the 17th century, and were commonly made and used in pairs.

A girandole has always been, comparatively speaking, a luxurious appliance for lighting, and in the great 18th-century period of French house decoration, the famous ciseleurs designed some exceedingly beautiful examples. A great variety of metals have been used for the purpose. Sometimes, as in the case of candlesticks, girandoles have been made in hardwoods. Gilded bronze has been a very frequent medium, but for table use silver is still the favorite material.

Girandoles, or lighting devices, have also been attached to looking glasses and furniture. Some popular mirrors, especially the convex style, and some large dressing glasses of the 19th century were known as "girandoles" because of the lighting devices mounted to their sides.

The word Girandole (pl. żyrandol) is also used in Poland to describe a traditional folk art. Poland’s "Traditional decorative forms included spider girandoles.",
which are decorative objects hung from the ceiling. Various materials are used to make them, including tissue paper cut, wrapped or manipulated into flowers or garland. "It was probably this enormous variety of form of spider girandoles that caused them to occur practically universally throughout Poland."  "The most recent version of spider girandoles were festoons and garlands of tissue which were stretched starwise at the ceiling."

References 

 

Light fixtures
Candles
Furniture
Antiques
Chandeliers